Barry Manilow is a studio album released by singer and songwriter Barry Manilow in 1989. It was Manilow's thirteenth studio album overall and second studio album on his second tenure with Arista Records. The album represented a hint of future album releases in that many of the songs were not written/co-written by Manilow, which until that point had been rare for him. After the release of this album, Manilow embarked on introducing contemporary audiences to pop music of the 1930s through the late 1940s.

The singles from this album were: "Keep Each Other Warm", "The One That Got Away", "Please Don't Be Scared" and "When the Good Times Come Again", which hit #12 on the Billboard Adult Contemporary chart in June 2020 in the wake of the COVID-19 pandemic. No singles from the album reached the Billboard Hot 100, but "Keep Each Other Warm" and "The One That Got Away" made the AC chart at #7 and #25 respectively in 1989.

Track listing

Side 1
 "Please Don't Be Scared" (Mindy Sterling) - 5:34
 "Keep Each Other Warm" (Andy Hill, Peter Sinfield) - 4:33
 "Once and For All" (Jimmy Webb) - 4:15
 "The One That Got Away" (Wayne Hammer, Jeff Slater)- 3:55
 "When the Good Times Come Again" (music: Richard Kerr; lyrics: Will Jennings) - 4:29

Side 2
 "Some Good Things Never Last" (Mark Radice) - 4:47
 "In Another World" (music: Richard Kerr; lyrics: Charlie Dore) - 4:12
 "You Begin Again" (music: Barry Manilow; lyrics: Adrienne Anderson) - 3:59
 "My Moonlight Memories of You" (Sandy Linzer, Irwin Levine) - 4:43
 "Anyone Can Do the Heartbreak" (music: Tom Snow; lyrics: Amanda McBroom) - 4:22
 "A Little Travelling Music, Please" (music: Barry Manilow; lyrics: Bruce Sussman, Jack Feldman) - 4:23

Personnel
Barry Manilow - vocals, piano
Dean Parks, Robbie McIntosh, Steve Dudas, Dann Huff, Russ Freeman - guitar
Laurence Juber - guitar, ukelele 
Dennis Belfield - bass
Jeff Slater - bass, keyboards
Pat Coil, Reg Powell, Jim Cox, Kevin Bassinson - piano
Paul "Wix" Wickens, Rich Tancredi - keyboards
Michael Lloyd - piano, synthesizer
Todd Herreman - Fairlight synthesizer
Claude Gaudette - synthesizer
Paul Leim, Vinnie Colaiuta, Ron Krasinski, Joe Franco - drums
Michael Fisher, Luís Jardim - percussion
Dana Robbins, Gary Herbig - saxophone
Dee Lewis, Wayne Hammer, Jeff Slater, Jim Haas, Joe Chemay, Joe Pizzulo - backing vocals
Ed Arkin - keyboard and synthesizer programming
Wayne Hammer, Jeff Slater - drum and synthesizer programming
Ben Forat - F-16 synthesizer programming

Certifications

References

1989 albums
Barry Manilow albums
Arista Records albums
Albums produced by Michael Lloyd (music producer)
Albums produced by Ric Wake